The Terrorism (Northern Ireland) Act 2006 (c 4) is an Act of the Parliament of the United Kingdom. It provided that Part 7 of the Terrorism Act 2000 allowing Diplock courts in Northern Ireland, which would otherwise have expired on 18 February 2006, would continue in force until 31 July 2007, subject to modifications.

Parliamentary debates
The Bill for this Act passed through its stages in the House of Commons on the following dates:
 

The Bill for this Act passed through its stages in the House of Lords on the following dates:

Provisions

Section 4 - Transitional provision in connection with expiry etc of Part 7 of 2000 Act
This section was extended by section 8(4) of the Justice and Security (Northern Ireland) Act 2007 which provided that an order under this section may make provision disregarding any of the amendments made by Schedule 1 to that Act for any purpose specified in the order.

The Terrorism (Northern Ireland) Act 2006 (Transitional Provisions and Savings) Order 2007 (S.I. 2007/2259) was made under this section.

See also
Terrorism Act (disambiguation)

References

General
Halsbury's Statutes

External links
The Terrorism (Northern Ireland) Act 2006, as amended from the National Archives.
The Terrorism (Northern Ireland) Act 2006, as originally enacted from the National Archives.
Explanatory notes to the Terrorism (Northern Ireland) Act 2006.

United Kingdom Acts of Parliament 2006
Acts of the Parliament of the United Kingdom concerning Northern Ireland
2006 in Northern Ireland